was the Mayor of Osaka, Japan, between 1923 and 1935.

Early life 
Seki was born on the Izu Peninsula in Shizuoka on September 26, 1873. He graduated from  the Koto Shogyo Gakko, now Hitotsubashi University, in 1893, and worked in the Ministry of Finance until he became a professor at his alma mater in 1897. The following year, he left for Europe, where he spent three years studying in Belgium. In 1910, he obtained the title of Doctor of Juridical Science.

Mayor of Osaka 
He became the Deputy Mayor of Osaka in 1914 before serving as Mayor from 1923 to 1935. He was instrumental in both the development of social capital, including the construction of ports and railways, and the implementation of urban social policy, including the establishment of public markets, the construction of city-provided housing and the establishment of the Osaka University of Commerce. He is most famous for overseeing the widening of the Midosuji, the avenue that stretches through the heart of Osaka. and the construction of the Osaka Subway Midosuji Line, which runs under the avenue.

Hajime Seki died of typhus on January 26, 1935, one year after he had been appointed to the House of Peers. He was 61.

References

External links 
 http://www.ndl.go.jp/portrait/e/datas/520.html?cat=94
 http://repository.brynmawr.edu/cgi/viewcontent.cgi?article=1015&context=cities_pubs

1873 births
1935 deaths
Mayors of Osaka
Japanese politicians
Hitotsubashi University alumni
People from Shizuoka Prefecture